The 2018–19 Oklahoma Sooners basketball team represented the University of Oklahoma in the 2018–19 NCAA Division I men's basketball season. They were led by eighth-year head coach Lon Kruger and played their home games at the Lloyd Noble Center in Norman, Oklahoma as a member of the Big 12 Conference. They finished the season 20-14, finished in 7th place. They lost in the First Round of the Big 12 tournament to West Virginia. They received a at-large bid to the NCAA Tournament where they defeated Ole Miss in the First Round before losing in the Second Round to Virginia.

Previous season
The Sooners finished the 2017–18 season with an overall record of 18–14, 8–10 in Big 12 play to finish in a tie for eighth place. They lost in the First Round of the Big 12 tournament to Oklahoma State. They received an at-large bid to the NCAA tournament where they lost in the First Round to Rhode Island.

Offseason

Departures

Incoming transfers

2018 recruiting class

2019 Recruiting class

Roster

Schedule and results

|-
!colspan=9 style=|Exhibition

|-
! colspan=9 style=|Regular season

|-
! colspan=9 style=| Big 12 Tournament

|-
! colspan=9 style=| NCAA tournament

Source

Rankings

References

Oklahoma
Oklahoma Sooners men's basketball seasons
Oklahoma